VentureStar was a single-stage-to-orbit reusable launch system proposed by Lockheed Martin and funded by the U.S. government. The goal was to replace the Space Shuttle by developing a re-usable spaceplane that could launch satellites into orbit at a fraction of the cost. While the requirement was for an uncrewed launcher, it was expected to carry passengers as cargo.

VentureStar was intended to be a commercial single-stage-to-orbit vehicle that would be launched vertically, but return to Earth as an airplane. Flights would have been leased to NASA as needed. After failures with the X-33 subscale technology demonstrator test vehicle, funding was cancelled in 2001.

VentureStar was essentially a bigger version of the X-33 but was not produced. The X-33 had ongoing problems meeting performance requirements for the carbonfibre hydrogen fuel tank. There were a number of other technologies that were part of the program, including the linear aerospike rocket engine. One point of praise was the metallic thermal protection system developed by BF Goodrich.

Advantages 

VentureStar's engineering and design would have offered numerous advantages over the Space Shuttle, representing considerable savings in time and materials, as well as increased safety.  VentureStar was expected to launch satellites into orbit at about 1/10 the cost of the Shuttle.

Readying VentureStar for flight would have dramatically differed from that of the Space Shuttle.  Unlike the Space Shuttle orbiter, which had to be lifted and assembled together with several other heavy components (a large external tank, plus two solid rocket boosters), VentureStar was to be simply inspected in a hangar like an airplane.

Also unlike the Space Shuttle, VentureStar would not have relied upon solid rocket boosters, which had to be hauled out of the ocean and then refurbished after each launch.  Furthermore, design specifications called for the use of linear aerospike engines that maintain thrust efficiency at all altitudes,  whereas the Shuttle relied upon conventional nozzle engines which achieve maximum efficiency at only a certain altitude.

VentureStar would have used a new metallic thermal protection system, safer and cheaper to maintain than the ceramic protection system used on the Space Shuttle. VentureStar's metallic heat shield would have eliminated 17,000 between-flight maintenance hours typically required to satisfactorily check (and replace if needed) the thousands of heat-resistant ceramic tiles that compose the Shuttle exterior.

VentureStar was expected to be safer than most modern rockets. Whereas most modern rockets fail catastrophically when an engine fails, VentureStar would have a thrust reserve in each engine in the event of an emergency.  For example, if an engine on VentureStar failed during ascent, another engine would shut off to counterbalance the failed thrust, and each of the remaining working engines could throttle up to safely continue the mission.

Unlike the Space Shuttle, whose solid rocket boosters produced chemical wastes, primarily hydrogen chloride, during launch, VentureStar's exhaust would have been composed of only water vapor, since VentureStar's main fuels would have been only liquid hydrogen and liquid oxygen. This would have given VentureStar the benefit of being environmentally clean. VentureStar's simpler design would have excluded hypergolic propellants and even hydraulics, relying instead upon electrical power for flight controls, doors and landing gear.

Because of its lighter design, VentureStar would have been able to land at almost any major airport in an emergency, whereas the Space Shuttle required much longer runways than available at most public airports.

Cancellation 

The VentureStar program was cancelled due to development cost concerns accompanied by technical problems and failures in the X-33 program, a program which was intended as proof-of-concept for some of the critical technologies needed by the VentureStar. The failure during a test of the X-33's complex, multi-lobe composite-structure cryogenic hydrogen tank was one of the main reasons for the cancellation of both the X-33 and the VentureStar. Ultimately, the VentureStar program required too many technical advances at too high a cost to be viable.

Program hardware

Examples: 
Metallic TPS
XRS-2200 Linear aerospike main engines
LOX tanks

One of the technological barriers at the time was the hydrogen fuel tank. One positive was that several years later the performance requirements for such a hydrogen tank were achieved, as NASA gained more experience with cryogenic carbon fiber fuel tanks.

September 7, 2004, Northrop Grumman and NASA engineers unveiled a liquid hydrogen tank made of carbon fiber composite material that had demonstrated the ability for repeated fuelings and simulated launch cycles. The tank was a simple cylinder, not the complex shape used for the X-33. Northrop Grumman concluded that these successful tests have enabled the development and refinement of new manufacturing processes that will allow the company to build large composite tanks without an autoclave; and design and engineering development of conformal fuel tanks appropriate for use on a single-stage-to-orbit vehicle.

In fiction 
In the 2001 novella and 2015 novel Lash-Up by Larry Bond and Chris Carlson, the VentureStar prototype is converted into an armed spacecraft named Defender in order to protect US space assets from China, which is using a space gun to destroy GPS satellites.

In John Varley's novel Red Thunder and sequels, one of the major protagonists is a former VentureStar pilot.

In the television series Star Trek: Enterprise, an operational VentureStar spaceplane is included in the opening credits as part of the history of human spaceflight.

In the television series Space Island One, a fleet of VentureStars resupply the titular commercial space station.

Diagram

See also 
 Lockheed Martin X-33
Skylon (spacecraft)
Orbital Sciences X-34

References

External links 

 
 Popsci article - October 1996 
Review of various Shuttle replacements

2000s United States cargo aircraft
Lockheed Martin
Lifting bodies
Rocket-powered aircraft
Single-stage-to-orbit
Proposed reusable launch systems
Space launch vehicles of the United States
Spaceplanes